The Diocese of Siedlce is a Latin Church ecclesiastical territory or diocese of the Catholic Church in Poland. Its episcopal see is Siedlce. The Diocese of Siedlce is a suffragan diocese in the ecclesiastical province of the metropolitan Archdiocese of Lublin.

History
 June 30, 1818: Established as Diocese of Podlachia
 1867: Suppressed to Diocese of Lublin
 1918: Restored as Diocese of Podlachia
 October 28, 1925: Renamed as Diocese of Siedlce

Special churches
Minor Basilicas:
 Bazylika św. Anny (Sanktuarium Maryjne), Kodeń (Basilica of St. Ann)
 Bazylika św. Jana Chrzciciela Sanktuarium Maryjne, Parczew( Basilica of St. John the Baptist)
 Sanktuarium Maryjne, Leśna Podlaska

Leadership
 Bishops of Siedlce
 Bishop Kazimierz Gurda (since 2014.05.24)
 Bishop Zbigniew Kiernikowski (2002.03.28 – 2014.04.16)
 Bishop Jan Wiktor Nowak (1996.03.25 – 2002.03.25)
 Bishop Jan Mazur (1968.10.24 – 1996.03.25)
 Bishop Ignacy Świrski (1946.04.12 – 1968.03.25)
 Bishop Henryk Ignacy Przeździecki (1925.10.28 – 1939.05.09)
 Bishops of Podlachia (Roman rite)
 Bishop Henryk Ignacy Przeździecki (1918.09.24 – 1925.10.28)
 Bishop Piotr Paweł Beniamin Szymański (1856.09.18 – 1867)
 Bishop Jan Marceli Gutkowski (1826.07.03 – 1842.05.19)
 Bishop Feliks Łukasz Lewiński (1819.03.29 – 1825.04.05)

See also
Roman Catholicism in Poland
Eugene Rozhitsky, an Eastern Orthodox (later the Byzantine Catholic) priest who served the diocese

Sources
 GCatholic.org
 Catholic Hierarchy
  Diocese website

Roman Catholic dioceses in Poland
Christian organizations established in 1925
Roman Catholic dioceses and prelatures established in the 20th century